Dunja is a Serbian and Croatian feminine given name.

Dunja may also refer to:
 Dunja (film), a 1955 Austrian film
 Dogna (Slovene: Dunja), a municipality in Italy
 Lancia Fulvia Dunja, a concept car

See also 

 Dunja, du, a West German schlager song
 Dunya (disambiguation)
 Dunia (disambiguation)